Alfred John Bartlett (7 July 1878 – 3 January 1926) was an Australian rules footballer who played for the Fitzroy Football Club in the Victorian Football League (VFL).

Sources
Holmesby, Russell & Main, Jim (2009). The Encyclopedia of AFL Footballers. 8th ed. Melbourne: Bas Publishing.

1878 births
VFL/AFL players born in England
Australian rules footballers from Victoria (Australia)
English players of Australian rules football
Fitzroy Football Club players
Fitzroy Football Club Premiership players
1926 deaths
One-time VFL/AFL Premiership players